Aceglatone (Glucaron) is an antineoplastic drug available in Japan.

It is an inhibitor of the enzyme β-glucuronidase.

References

Acetate esters
Antineoplastic drugs
Lactones